Ilex glomerata is a tree or shrub in the family Aquifoliaceae. The flowers are yellow green or yellow. The specific epithet  is from the Latin meaning "closely gathered", referring to the flowers. Habitat is forests from sea level to  altitude. I. glomerata is found in Burma, Sumatra, Peninsular Malaysia and Borneo.

References

glomerata
Plants described in 1895
Flora of Myanmar
Flora of Sumatra
Flora of Peninsular Malaysia
Flora of Borneo